Juan Ignacio Martín Nardoni (born 14 July 2002) is an Argentine professional footballer who plays as a central midfielder for Racing Club.

Club career
Nardoni's youth career started with stints in local clubs Boca de Nelson and FBC Libertad, prior to his arrival in Santa Fe which saw him join Corinthians. Soon after, Nardoni joined the ranks of Unión Santa Fe; where his breakthrough into senior football would arrive at the beginning of 2019–20. Manager Leonardo Madelón selected him for his professional debut on 31 August 2019, as the midfielder replaced Gastón Comas after seventy-three minutes of a 2–1 defeat to San Lorenzo in the Primera División.

International career
In July and August 2017, Nardoni was selected to train with the Argentina U15s; under the management of Diego Placente and Pablo Aimar.

Career statistics
.

References

External links

2002 births
Living people
People from La Capital Department, Santa Fe
Argentine people of Italian descent
Argentine footballers
Association football midfielders
Argentine Primera División players
Unión de Santa Fe footballers
Sportspeople from Santa Fe Province